599 Lexington Avenue is a 653 ft (199m) tall, 50-story skyscraper in Midtown Manhattan, New York City, designed by Edward Larrabee Barnes/John MY Lee Architects. It was the first building constructed by Mortimer Zuckerman and his company Boston Properties in New York City. The site was acquired for $84 million in 1984, and completed in 1986. The building is adjacent to the Citicorp Tower and is considered a well-designed contextual partner to the area. The entryway to the Lexington Ave. subway with glass shed roof, was an homage to the Citicorp Tower roof.

It is tied with both of the Silver Towers as the 89th tallest building in New York City. The lobby contains Frank Stella's Salto nel Mio Sacco. The building was completed without an anchor tenant.

In 2016, FXFowle Architects completed a remodel of the interior lobby, hallways, and elevators to better light the Stella artwork and brighten the lobby space. Bruce Fowle, the architect, was a protegé of Edward Larrabee Barnes and past employee. Advertising firm, Pentagram, assisted with the graphical design of the way-finding information

Awards 
599 Lexington Avenue was awarded the University of Virginia's Thomas Jefferson Award for Architecture in 1981

In popular media 
599 Lexington Ave was used extensively as the headquarters of the fictional Pemrose Corporation in the 1987 Michael J, Fox movie, "The Secret of My Success."

Tenants 

Shearman & Sterling (the major tenant; expanded holdings by six floors in 2002)
Cowen Group
K&L Gates
Welsh, Carson, Anderson & Stowe (17th floor & entire 18th floor), having moved from 320 Park Avenue
Reed Smith (22nd floor)
Commonwealth Bank North American Branch (30th floor)
Atreaus Capital, Cogent Partners and Istithmar World (each occupying part of the 38th floor)
Cornerstone Research (41st floor & entire 42nd, 43rd and 44th floors)
Retromer Therapeutics (47th floor)

See also
List of tallest buildings in New York City

References

External links
Emporis
Skyscraperpage
Paul Goldberger, Architecture View; Out-of-Town Builders Bring Their Shows to New York, The New York Times, June 1, 1986.

Skyscraper office buildings in Manhattan
Midtown Manhattan
Lexington Avenue
Office buildings completed in 1986
Edward Larrabee Barnes buildings
Turtle Bay, Manhattan